Harris Academy Peckham (also known as the Academy at Peckham and Peckham Academy) is a coeducational academy in Peckham, in the London Borough of Southwark. Catering for pupils from the ages of 11 to 18, the school specialises in the curriculum areas of Business and Enterprise, ICT, and the Performing Arts.

The school was formerly named Warwick Park, but unsatisfactory test results led to its being given an overhaul and renamed The Academy at Peckham. The buildings were refurbished and the school was given better resources. After this, the school gradually began to improve. In 2007, the school was renamed again, to become The Harris Academy at Peckham (now Harris Academy Peckham) following the receipt of funding from Lord Harris of Peckham. This also resulted in a change of the school logo to reflect its place in the Harris Federation.

An Ofsted report on the school, issued in September 2009, claimed that the school was "good" and was "improving rapidly". Catherine Loxton was instated as permanent principal of the school in October 2009. From the Autumn term of 2013 Mr Rob Hunter, coming from Harris Academy Merton, took over the role of principal.

Overview 
The school is headed by a Headteacher and a Board of Governors. There are also several assistants to the headteacher, known as 'Vice Principals' and 'Assistant Vice-Principals' respectively. There is also a Head of Year for each year group.

School terms 
The school year is split into four terms:
 Autumn Term, which begins in early September and ends in mid-December. New pupils are admitted at the start of this term.
 Winter Term, which begins in early January and ends in early April.
 Spring Term, which begins in late April and ends in late May.
 Summer Term, which begins in early June and ends in late July. Year 11 students leave after their GCSE exams mid-way through this term.

The school day 
The school day, which includes six 50-minute lesson periods, is structured as follows:

The Academy is open for students throughout the day from 8.00 until 17.00, and during these times the school library and ICT suites remain open for use.

Curriculum 
The school offers a range of subjects. The compulsory subjects are as follows:

Students are asked to choose their GCSE subjects at the end of Year 9. They must choose two GCSE courses and one BTEC course. The choices are as follows:

However, students who excel at their studies are often entered for GCSE exams one to two years early, and are allowed to take extra GCSE courses as an extra-curricular activity.

Music and Drama 
The school has an extensive Music and Drama department, with a history of high examination grades (most students receiving Distinction or higher) and acclaimed theatrical performances, including an annual school performance and occasional performances at other venues (including the Royal Opera House). The drama department also has connections with Peckham Shed. There is also an annual musical soiree held and organised by the Music students.

Uniforms 
Students of the academy are required to wear a white shirt, a light blue blazer with the school logo, and black trousers or a black skirt. 
they are also required to wear a tie which color may vary according to the 'house' (Blue, Green, Red Yellow) they are in. They may also wear a back jumper. Members of the student council may wear a student council badge on the lapel of their blazer. Prefects as well are required to a prefect badge on top of their blazer.

Boys

Compulsory
 School blazer with crest 
 White shirt
 School tie 
 Black trousers
 Black formal leather shoes

Girls

Compulsory
 School blazer with crest 
 White shirt
 School tie 
 Black skirt/ trousers
 Black formal leather shoes

Optional
 School jumper (design to be changed soon)
 Black/navy blue coat
 Black woollen hat/beret

Sports 
The school has many sports teams, including its own teams for football, basketball, rugby, badminton, and cricket. Many students also belong to local sports teams. The school also has a team of cheerleaders, who perform at the annual Harris Federation Sports Day and at other major sporting events.

Clubs and societies 
The Academy has a wide range of clubs and societies, which include:
 a Gifted and Talented Society
 sports clubs
 revision clubs

Special events 
The school holds several events throughout the year, including:
 The Annual School Awards Evening
 The Annual Summer Fair
 The Annual Musical Soiree
 An Annual Theatrical Performance (usually held around Christmas)
 Several sports tournaments

See also 
Harris Federation

External links 
Official Website

Peckham
Academies in the London Borough of Southwark
Educational institutions established in 2003
Secondary schools in the London Borough of Southwark
Peckham
2003 establishments in England